Midt i begynnelsen is the tenth studio album by Norwegian rock band deLillos.

Track listing
"Stum"
"Vakre dager"
"En stefar"
"Torsdag"
"Klok"
"Fordi"
"Mindre alvorlige ting"
"40 år"
"Jeg står opp"
"Fuglen"
"Film"
"Malene"
"En sang til (hidden track)"

2002 albums
DeLillos albums
Sonet Records albums